SA Airlink Flight 8911 was a positioning flight from Durban International Airport to Pietermaritzburg Airport, South Africa, that crashed into the grounds of Merebank Secondary School, Durban shortly after take-off on 24 September 2009, injuring the three occupants of the aircraft and one on the ground. The captain of the flight subsequently died of his injuries on 7 October 2009.

Flight

The flight was a positioning flight (ferry flight) from Durban to Pietermaritzburg, carrying no passengers. The three crew members consisted of captain Allister Freeman, first officer Sonja Bierman, and a flight attendant.

The aircraft, a BAe Jetstream 41 with registration  had only flown 50 hours since its last service. The aircraft had been diverted to Durban from Pietermaritzburg the previous evening by bad weather.

Crash

At around 8:00 a.m. local time (06:00 UTC) on 24 September 2009, the flight departed Durban International Airport. Shortly after takeoff, the crew reported loss of engine power and smoke from the rear of the aircraft, and declared an emergency. The school was closed on the day of the accident because it was Heritage Day, a public holiday. The pilot ditched the aircraft on the sports field of the school, avoiding hitting nearby residential properties; the aircraft broke into three pieces on impact.

Rescue

Rescue workers arrived on the scene shortly after the crash and cut the three crew members out of the wreckage using hydraulic rescue tools. The captain was airlifted to St. Augustine's Hospital at 11:00 a.m. local time (09:00 UTC) in a critical condition; the critically injured first officer and seriously injured flight attendant were taken to other nearby hospitals. A street cleaner on the school's perimeter was struck by the plane and was taken to hospital. The captain died of his injuries on 7 October 2009.

Investigation

Investigators from the South African Civil Aviation Authority (CAA) were dispatched to the crash scene; the CAA conducted an on-site investigation to determine the possible cause of the crash. The flight data recorder and cockpit voice recorder were retrieved and used in the investigation. British Aerospace, the manufacturer of the aircraft, dispatched a team of technical experts to assist in the investigation should they have been required by the CAA.

On 9 October 2009, the CAA issued a press release requesting the public's assistance in finding a bearing cap from one of the engines. The cap, which possibly separated from the engine during takeoff, could not be found at the crash site or at the airport.

On 23 December 2009, the CAA issued the following press release : "In the case of the FADN (Merebank) accident the initial cause appears to be that of an engine failure during take-off which finally resulted in an accident when the human factor involvement resulted in the wrong engine being shut down. This type of engine failure has occurred previously and the cause is known to the manufacturer

See also
Kegworth air disaster, TransAsia Airways Flight 235 and Azerbaijan Airlines Flight 56 - other cases of wrong engine shutdown

References

External links
 Final Accident Investigation Report (Archive) by the South African Civil Aviation Authority
 News archive – Airlink – Has information about the incident in the year 2009
 Flight 8911 at the Aviation Safety Network

Aviation accidents and incidents in 2009
Accidents and incidents involving the British Aerospace Jetstream
Aviation accidents and incidents in South Africa
2009 in South Africa
History of Durban
Airliner accidents and incidents caused by pilot error
September 2009 events in South Africa
Airliner accidents and incidents caused by engine failure
Airliner accidents and incidents caused by wrong engine shutdown
Events in Durban